The Lunar Atmosphere and Dust Environment Explorer (LADEE) was a NASA lunar exploration and technology demonstration mission. It was launched on a Minotaur V rocket from the Mid-Atlantic Regional Spaceport on September 7, 2013. During its seven-month mission, LADEE orbited around the Moon's equator, using its instruments to study the lunar exosphere and dust in the Moon's vicinity. Instruments included a dust detector, neutral mass spectrometer, and ultraviolet-visible spectrometer, as well as a technology demonstration consisting of a laser communications terminal. The mission ended on April 18, 2014, when the spacecraft's controllers intentionally crashed LADEE into the far side of the Moon, which, later, was determined to be near the eastern rim of Sundman V crater.

Planning and preparations
LADEE was announced during the presentation of NASA's  budget in February 2008. It was initially planned to be launched with the Gravity Recovery and Interior Laboratory (GRAIL) satellites.

Mechanical tests including acoustic, vibration and shock tests were completed prior to full-scale thermal vacuum chamber testing at NASA's Ames Research Center in April 2013. During August 2013, LADEE underwent final balancing, fuelling and mounting on the launcher, and all pre-launch activities were complete by August 31, ready for the launch window which opened on September 6.

NASA Ames was responsible for the day-to-day functions of LADEE while the Goddard Space Flight Center operated the sensor suite and technology demonstration payloads as well as managing launch operations. The LADEE mission cost approximately $280 million, which included spacecraft development and science instruments, launch services, mission operations, science processing and relay support.

Atmospheric glow

The Moon may have a tenuous atmosphere of moving particles constantly leaping up from and falling back to the Moon's surface, giving rise to a "dust atmosphere" that looks static but is composed of dust particles in constant motion. According to models proposed starting from 1956, on the daylit side of the Moon, solar ultraviolet and X-ray radiation is energetic enough to knock electrons out of atoms and molecules in the lunar soil. Positive charges build up until the tiniest particles of lunar dust (measuring 1 micrometre and smaller) are repelled from the surface and lofted anywhere from metres to kilometres high, with the smallest particles reaching the highest altitudes. Eventually they fall back toward the surface where the process is repeated. On the night side, the dust is negatively charged by electrons in the solar wind. Indeed, the "fountain model" suggests that the night side would charge up to higher voltages than the day side, possibly launching dust particles to higher velocities and altitudes. This effect could be further enhanced during the portion of the Moon's orbit where it passes through Earth's magnetotail; see Magnetic field of the Moon for more detail. On the terminator there could be significant horizontal electric fields forming between the day and night areas, resulting in horizontal dust transport.

Also, the Moon has been shown to have a "sodium tail" too faint to be detected by the human eye. It is hundreds of thousands of miles long, and was discovered in 1998 as a result of Boston University scientists observing the Leonid meteor storm. The Moon is constantly releasing atomic sodium gas from its surface, and solar radiation pressure accelerates the sodium atoms in the anti-sunward direction, forming an elongated tail which points away from the Sun. As of April 2013, it had not yet been determined whether ionized sodium gas atoms or charged dust are the cause of the reported Moon glows.

Chinese lander
China's Chang'e 3 spacecraft, which was launched on December 1, 2013, and entered lunar orbit on December 6, was expected to contaminate the tenuous lunar exosphere with both propellant from engine firings and lunar dust from the vehicle's landing. While concern was expressed that this could disrupt LADEE's mission, such as its baseline readings of the Moon's exosphere, it instead provided additional science value since both the quantity and composition of the spacecraft's propulsion system exhaust were known. Data from LADEE was used to track the distribution and eventual dissipation of the exhaust and dust in the Moon's exosphere. It was also possible to observe the migration of water, one component of the exhaust, giving insight on how it is transported and becomes trapped around the lunar poles.

Mission objectives
The LADEE mission was designed to address three major science goals:
 Determine the global density, composition, and time variability of the tenuous lunar exosphere before it is perturbed by further human activity;
 Determine if the Apollo astronaut sightings of diffuse emission at tens of kilometers above the surface were sodium glow or dust;
 Document the dust impactor environment (size, frequency) to help guide design engineering for the outpost and also future robotic missions;
and one technology demonstration goal:
 Demonstrate two-way laser communication from lunar orbit.

Spaceflight operations

Launch
LADEE was launched on September 7, 2013, at 03:27 UTC (September 6, 11:27 p.m. EDT), from the Wallops Flight Facility at the Mid-Atlantic Regional Spaceport on a Minotaur V carrier rocket. This was the first lunar mission to be launched from that facility. The launch had the potential for visibility along much of the U.S. eastern seaboard, from Maine to South Carolina; clear weather allowed numerous observers from New York City to Virginia to observe the ascent, first stage cutoff and second stage ignition.

As the Minotaur V is a solid-propellant rocket, spacecraft attitude control on this mission operated a bit differently from a typical liquid-fueled rocket with more continuous closed-loop feedback. The first three Minotaur stages "fly a pre-programmed attitude profile" to gain velocity and deliver the vehicle to its preliminary trajectory, while the fourth stage is used to modify the flight profile and deliver the LADEE spacecraft into perigee for the spin-stabilized fifth stage to then put the spacecraft into a highly elliptical orbit around Earth—the first of three—to begin a month-long Lunar transit.

While now separated from the LADEE spacecraft, both the fourth and fifth stages of the Minotaur V reached orbit, and are now space debris in Earth orbit.

A launch photo with a frog thrown high by the pressure wave became popular on social media. The frog's condition is uncertain.

Lunar transit

LADEE took an unusual approach in its transit of the Moon. Launched into a highly elliptical Earth orbit, the spacecraft made three increasingly larger laps around Earth before getting close enough to enter into Lunar orbit. The transit required approximately one month.

After separating from the Minotaur, high electrical currents were detected in the satellite's reaction wheels causing them to be shut down. There was no indication of a fault, and after the protection limits were adjusted, orientation with reaction wheels was resumed the following day.

The LADEE spacecraft made three "phasing orbits" of Earth before it accomplished a Lunar orbit insertion (LOI), which occurred at perigee of the third orbit using a three-minute engine burn. The planned argument of perigee is 155 degrees, while its characteristic energy, C3 is -2.75 km2/s2. The novel trajectory using orbital phasing loops was done for four main reasons:
 the Minotaur V launch vehicle had insufficient delta-v to put the  LADEE directly into a trans-lunar injection.
 to handle potential off-nominal launch dispersions from the Minotaur V—which is a stack of five solid rocket stages, and is not considered to be a particularly precise rocket—in a propellant-efficient manner while leaving the orbit profile flexible to large dispersions in the initial injection orbit.
 to widen the launch window to five days. In the event, LADEE did not need this as the launch occurred at the beginning of the window on the first day.
 to increase mission robustness in the face of any anomalous or missed orbital maneuvers with the spacecraft.

Lunar orbit and systems checkout

LADEE entered lunar orbit on October 6, 2013, when LADEE was put into an elliptical capture orbit of 24 hours duration. LADEE's systems and instruments were checked out after the orbit was lowered to  altitude.

Lunar Laser Communication Demonstration

This test set a downlink record of 622 megabits per second (Mbps) from spacecraft to ground, and an "error-free data upload rate of 20 Mbps" from ground station to spacecraft. Tests were carried out over a 30-day test period.

The LLCD is a free-space optical communication system. It is NASA's first attempt at two-way space communication using an optical laser instead of radio waves. It is expected to lead to operational laser systems on future NASA satellites.

Science phase
The science phase of LADEE's primary mission was initially planned as 100 days, and later given a 28-day extension. The extension provided an opportunity for the satellite to gather an additional full lunar cycle worth of very low-altitude data to help scientists unravel the nature of the Moon's tenuous exosphere.

End of mission
Spacecraft controllers ordered a final engine burn on April 11, 2014, to lower LADEE to within  of the Moon's surface and set it up for impact no later than April 21. The probe then dealt with the April 2014 lunar eclipse on April 15, during which it could not generate power because it was in Earth's shadow for four hours. Science instruments were turned off and heaters were cycled during the event to conserve energy but keep the spacecraft warm. Engineers did not expect LADEE to survive, as it was not designed to handle such an environment, but it exited the eclipse with only a few pressure sensor malfunctions.

During its penultimate orbit on April 17, LADEE's periapsis took it within  of the lunar surface. Contact with the spacecraft was lost around 04:30 UTC on April 18 when it moved behind the Moon. The far side of the Moon was chosen to avoid the possibility of damaging historically important locations such as the Luna and Apollo landing sites. NASA used the Lunar Reconnaissance Orbiter to image the impact location, which was determined to be near the eastern rim of Sundman V crater.

Spacecraft

Design
LADEE is the first spacecraft designed, integrated, built, and tested by NASA's Ames Research Center. The spacecraft is of a novel design (a spacecraft bus never previously flown)—and of much lower cost than typical NASA science missions—which presented novel challenges to the trajectory design team in getting the new spacecraft launched to the Moon with a high-confidence spaceflight trajectory plan, while dealing with a first-use new rocket (Minotaur V) and a spacecraft with no flight test legacy. (see Lunar transit, above.)

The bus has the ability to perform on various kinds of missions—including voyages to the Moon and Near-Earth objects—with different modules or applicable systems. This modular concept is an innovative way of transitioning away from custom designs and toward multi-use designs and assembly-line production, which could dramatically reduce the cost of spacecraft development. The LADEE spacecraft bus modules consist of the Radiator Module which carries the avionics, electrical system, and attitude sensors; the Bus Module; the Payload Module that carries the two largest instruments; and the Extension Modules, which house the propulsion system.

Specifications

Power
Electrical power was generated by a photovoltaic system composed of 30 panels of silicon solar cells producing 295 W at one AU. The solar panels were mounted on the satellite's exterior surfaces and the electrical power was stored in one lithium-ion battery providing up to 24 Ah of 28-volt power.

Propulsion system
The LADEE propulsion system consisted of an orbit control system (OCS) and a reaction control system (RCS). The OCS provided velocity control along the +Z axis for large velocity adjustments. The RCS provided three-axis attitude control during burns of the OCS system, and also provided momentum dumps for the reaction wheels which were the primary attitude control system between OCS burns.

The main engine was a 455N High Performance Apogee Thruster (HiPAT). The high efficiency 22N attitude control thrusters are manufactured using high temperature materials and similar to the HiPAT. The main engine provided the majority of the thrust for spacecraft trajectory correction maneuvers. The control system thrusters were used for the small maneuvers planned for the science phase of the mission.

Following the science phase, a decommissioning period occurred, during which the altitude was gradually lowered until the spacecraft impacted the lunar surface.

Science payload
LADEE carried three scientific instruments and a technology demonstration payload.

The science payload consists of:
 The Neutral Mass Spectrometer (NMS), which performed in situ measurements of exospheric atoms and molecules via mass spectroscopy. Parts of NMS were based on the SAM instrument on the Mars Science Laboratory.
 The UV-Vis Spectrometer (UVS), which measured both the dust and exosphere by ultraviolet–visible spectroscopy. The instrument was based on the UV-Vis spectrometer on the LCROSS mission.
 Lunar Dust EXperiment (LDEX), which directly measured dust using an impact ionization detector.  This functions by measuring the ionization of particles hitting the detector. The instrument built on experience gained from similar instruments on Galileo, Ulysses, and Cassini.

Technology demonstration payload
LADEE also carried a technology demonstration payload for testing an optical communication system. The Lunar Laser Communication Demonstration (LLCD) used a laser to transmit and receive data as pulses of light, in much the same way as data is transferred in a fiber optic cable. Three ground stations were used. This method of communication could potentially provide data rates five times higher than the previous radio frequency communication system. The technology is a direct predecessor to NASA's Laser Communications Relay Demonstration (LCRD) system which was due to launch in 2017, and actually launched in 2021.

Preliminary results
The LADEE science teams continued to analyze data acquired at the time of the Chang'e 3 landing on December 14, 2013.
 The Lunar Dust EXperiment (LDEX) team noted an increase in dust around the time of the landing. However, the rise preceded the landing time by many hours, suggesting a different origin. Indeed, the Geminids meteor shower coincided with this landing event and produced elevated dust counts before, during and after the landing period. The team reported that "if LADEE did encounter any lunar soil particles thrown up by the final descent of Chang'e 3, they would have been lost in the background of Geminid-produced events."
 The Neutral Mass Spectrometer (NMS) team has been searching the data for exhaust gas species such as water, carbon monoxide and carbon dioxide (CO and CO2) as well as nitrogen (N2).
 The Ultraviolet and Visible light Spectrometer (UVS) carried out a series of before/after observations looking for effects of both the landing and meteor showers. Analysis revealed an increase in sodium in the exosphere in connection with the Geminid meteor shower, as well as evidence of increased light scattering due to dust. The UVS also monitored emission lines of atomic oxygen, and saw emissions that may have indicated the presence of both iron (Fe) and titanium (Ti), which were expected but they had never before been observed.
Helium, argon and neon gases were determined to be the most abundant species in the lunar exosphere. The helium and neon were found to be supplied by the solar wind.
 On August 17, 2015, based on studies with the LADEE spacecraft, NASA scientists reported the detection of neon in the exosphere of the Moon.

Team
The team for LADEE included contributors from NASA Headquarters, Washington D.C., NASA's Ames Research Center, Moffett Field, California, NASA's Goddard Space Flight Center, Greenbelt, Maryland, and the Laboratory for Atmospheric and Space Physics at the University of Colorado at Boulder. Guest investigators include those from the University of California, Berkeley;The Johns Hopkins University Applied Physics Laboratory, Laurel, Maryland; the University of Colorado; the University of Maryland; and NASA's Goddard Space Flight Center, Greenbelt, Maryland.

Gallery

See also

 List of artificial objects on the Moon

References

External links

 NASA's LADEE Mission site
 LADEE at NASA Science
 MIT's Lincoln Lab, lasercomm terminal development
 NASA's Lunar Science Program - February 27, 2008 - Kelly Snook
 Overview for K-8 students (YouTube video)

Space probes launched in 2013
Spacecraft that orbited the Moon
Spacecraft that impacted the Moon
Laser communication in space
Missions to the Moon
NASA space probes
Destroyed space probes
2014 on the Moon